Sikaiana is a Polynesian language, spoken by about 730 people on Sikaiana in the Solomon Islands.

Introduction

History
According to legend, the island was founded by Tui Atafu, who killed off all the indigenous people and proclaimed himself chief.  Some say that Tui Atafu was from an island called Atafu in the Tokelau islands, while others speculate he came from Tonga.  But later, Sikaiana was invaded by Tongans, leaving many people who lived on Sikaiana dead. In the late 1920s ritual houses were burned and missionaries from the Melanesian Mission came to Sikaiana and completely converted almost everyone on the island to Christianity.  They burnt down the ritual houses because they believed that people would still have faith in other religions if it were still there. The people were eager to learn to read and write since it offered educational and employment opportunities off the island, which helped contribute to the success of the missionaries (Donner, 2012).

Population
The Sikaiana language is a Polynesian outlier language spoken on Sikaiana in the Central Solomons, about ninety miles east of the Malaita Island in Polynesia. There are about 730 speakers of this language left in the world, a very low number for any language.

Classification
Sikaiana is an Austronesian language in the Ellicean family. Its sister languages include Kapingamarangi, Nukumanu, Nukuoro, Nukuria, Ontong Java, Takuu, and Tuvaluan.

Sounds

Consonants
Sikaiana uses nine different consonants which are reflexes of the Proto-Polynesian language.  The consonants include /p/, /t/, /k/, /f~h/, /v/, /s/, /m/, /n/, and /l/.  In most situations, [h] and [f] are in free variation, but in many words, only [h] can be used (Donner 2012).  There is also a length distinction for consonants.  This sometimes occurs as a result of a non-pronunciation of a vowel.  For example, hahai changes to hhai because the first /a/ is simply omitted. Double consonants can also be used as a form of reduplication, showing agreement in verbs with plural subjects, or to mark repeated actions (Donner 2012).

Vowels
There are five vowel phonemes in Sikaiana which include /a/, /e/, /i/, /o/, and /u/. The phonemes /u/ and /i/ are realized as the glides [w] and [j] respectively, usually when preceding /a/.  Like the consonants, the vowel phonemes are all reflexes from the Proto-Polynesian language.  Vowel length is distinctive in Sikaiana. For example, the word for ‘shell tool’ is aha, while the word for ‘cyclone’ is ahaa.  Such a slight difference in the pronunciation can make a big difference in the meaning of the word, although some native speakers who were born after World War II don't know what the original forms of the words are (Donner 1996).

Grammar

Basic word order
The basic constituent order for Sikaiana is subject verb object.  Although the order may vary, this pattern is always used for short, simple statements.  Object subject verb and object verb subject are not used in any oceanic language, which means that it will not be used in Sikaiana (Lichtenberk, 2012).  In the Sikaiana grammar system, sentences that start with a noun usually do not lead with a preposition, but for noun phrases that follow a verb phrase, it may or may not lead with a preposition (Donner, 2012).  As for nouns and noun phrases, there must always be a preceding article except if it is a noun of place, names, or free pronouns.  The articles that usually precede a noun is either te or n  The use of these articles makes nouns easily distinguishable from other parts of speech (Donner, 2012).

Morphology
Sikaiana uses extensive morphology to transform words to better express more complex sentences.  Like many other Polynesian languages, Sikaiana has two types of nominal possession markers.  There is an alienable marker which is a, and an inalienable marker, o. Pronominal possessive markers differ slightly.  The alienable marker for a pronoun is ana and the inalienable possession marker is ona.  Pronouns in Sikaiana include singular, first person inclusive, first person exclusive, second person, and third person.  In order to nominalize verbs in Sikaiana, the suffix ana is added to a verb to nominalize it.  There are also length distinction morphemes used.  For example, taku means ‘my’, and takuu means ‘axe’.

Vocabulary
Sikaiana is very similar to the Proto-Polynesian language, so many words that are present in Polynesian languages are also in the Sikaiana language. For example, hale in Sikaiana means house, and the same word is also house in Hawaiian.

Endangerment

Vitality
The people of Sikaiana speak the Sikaiana language or Central Solomon Pidgin English.  After WWII, many people from Sikaiana migrated to Honiara, the capital of the Solomon Islands in search of jobs and education (Donner, 2002).  This means that there was a decrease in the use of the language, since Sikaiana was not the language mainly used in that area.  A decrease in the advantages of using the Sikaiana language increases the endangerment of it.

Materials
Although there is a decrease in the number of speakers of the Sikaiana language, there is a dictionary which was put together by Arthur Capell in 1935 which covers vocabulary, grammar, typology, and brief history of the Sikaiana language.  It may be possible for someone to learn how to speak Sikaiana if they read and studied the whole dictionary.  Some other sources are by William Donner, who visited Sikaiana in the 1970s and 1980s, and wrote many things regarding history, language change, culture, and emigration of the Sikaiana people. Most of Donner's work was published in the Journal Pacific Studies.

Further reading
Donner, W. (1996). Lingua Franca and Vernacular: Language Use and Language Change on Sikaiana. In Pacific Studies, Vol. 19, No.2. 
Donner, W. (2002). Rice and Tea, Fish and Taro: Sikaiana Migration to Honiara. In Pacific Studies, Vol. 25. 
Donner, W. W. (2012). Sikaiana Dictionary. Retrieved from sikaianaarchives.com: http://www.sikaianaarchives.com/wp-content/uploads/2012/06/Sikdict.pdf

References

External links
 Portions of the Book of Common Prayer in Sikaiana, 1932 Anglican liturgical document in Sikaiana.
 Te Kaitapu i Talatala o Sikaiana A Liturgy for Melanesia in the Language of Sikaiana (1984), digitized by Richard Mammana
 A Sikaiana dictionary that also includes grammar of the Sikaiana language (2012)
 Paradisec has two collections of Arthur Cappell's materials (AC1, AC2) that include Sikaiana language materials.

Ellicean languages
Polynesian languages
Endangered Austronesian languages